Smith Westerns were an American indie rock band from Chicago, Illinois, United States, composed of brothers Cullen and Cameron Omori as well as Max Kakacek, Julien Ehrlich and Hal James. Their musical influences included David Bowie, T. Rex and Oasis.

History

Smith Westerns (2009)
Their self-titled debut album was released on HoZac Records on June 5, 2009. Most of the album was recorded throughout the winter and early spring in Max Kakacek's basement.

Dye It Blonde (2011)
They released a new single, "Weekend", on November 4, 2010, from their album Dye It Blonde, which was released on January 18, 2011.

Soft Will (2013)
The band signed to Mom + Pop Music on March 5, 2013, and released Soft Will on June 25, 2013, following up from their 2011 LP, Dye It Blonde. The first single off the album, "Varsity," was released March 6, 2013. The album has received mostly positive reviews upon release.

Later work and breakup
On December 13, 2014, the band announced that they would go on an indefinite hiatus. They later confirmed that they were permanently breaking up.

Since the breakup, Cullen Omori began a solo career, signing to Sub Pop Records, while Max Kakacek, Julien Ehrlich, and touring keyboardist Ziyad Asrar formed the band Whitney.

Discography

Studio albums

Singles

References

Garage rock groups from Illinois
American glam rock musical groups
Indie rock musical groups from Illinois
Musical groups established in 2007
Musical quartets
Musical groups from Chicago
Fat Possum Records artists
Mom + Pop Music artists